Linda Jansson (born 10 September 1974) is a Finnish former professional tennis player.

Biography
Jansson comes from Åland, a Swedish speaking autonomous region of Finland.

As a professional player she was most successful in doubles, with a best ranking of 233 and six ITF titles. She played the doubles rubber in ten Fed Cup ties for Finland, including a World Group quarterfinal against Australia in 1993, which was the team's best ever run in the competition. Outside of tennis, she also competed in the sport of racketlon and was the world champion in 2006, by which stage she was competing for Sweden.

Since retiring she has remained involved in tennis, as an administrator and coach in Sweden. She has served on the board of the Swedish Tennis Federation and was a tournament director for the WTA Tour event Nordic Light Open.

ITF finals

Singles (0–2)

Doubles (6–7)

References

External links
 
 
 

1974 births
Living people
Finnish female tennis players
Sportspeople from Åland
Swedish-speaking Finns